Makounta is a village in the Paphos District of Cyprus, located 2 km south of Argaka. Overlooking the bay of Polis Chrysochous, Makounda is adjacent to Argaka (2 km southwest), and nearby there is also a motocross track. Makounta is located 87 m above sea level.

Naming 
Makounta is a village located four kilometers inland from Chrysochou bay and three kilometers north of Pelathousa. Goodwin claims that Makounta means “mushrooms” in ancient Greek. Turkish Cypriots adopted the alternative name Yakacık in 1958. Yaka means “collar,” “bank,” “edge” or “shore.”

References

Communities in Paphos District